Kansas City Southern Depot may refer to:

Kansas City Southern Depot (DeQuincy, Louisiana)
Kansas City Southern Depot (Leesville, Louisiana), a National Register of Historic Places listing in Vernon Parish, Louisiana
Kansas City Southern Depot (Mansfield, Louisiana), a National Register of Historic Places listing in DeSoto Parish, Louisiana
Kansas City Southern Railway Depot (Many, Louisiana)
Kansas City Southern Depot (Vivian, Louisiana)
Kansas City Southern Depot, Zwolle, Louisiana
Kansas City Southern Railway Building (Kansas City, Missouri)

See also
Kansas City Southern Railroad Bridge, Cross Bayou, Shreveport, Louisiana